A Morgadinha dos Canaviais is a Portuguese romance novel by Júlio Dinis, published in 1868. Set in the nineteenth century, the story revolves around Madalena Constança, a girl of great beauty and generosity.

The novel was made into a film in 1949, directed by Caetano Bonucci and Amadeu Ferrari.

References

1868 novels
Portuguese romance novels
Portuguese-language novels
1949 films